Chapultepec Lupita is a Tex-Mex restaurant in Houston, in the U.S. state of Texas.

Description
Chapultepec Lupita is a Tex-Mex restaurant operating in a "funky old house that seems to go on forever", according to the Houston Press. Located in Houston's Montrose neighborhood, the restaurant has been described as "an institution for the all-night crowd looking for a late-night/early-morning hangover cure". The menu includes alambres, chilaquiles, enchiladas, huevos rancheros, mole sauce, quesadillas, Mediterranean-style salmon, tortilla-crusted snapper, tamales, and pecan cheesecake. The drink menu has approximately 60 tequilas and 20 margarita varieties.

Reception
Eric Sandler included the restaurant in Eater Houston 2013 list of 16 "classic" greasy spoons. Chapultepec was included in the Houston Chronicle 2016 list of best restaurant salsas.

See also
 List of Tex-Mex restaurants
 Tex-Mex cuisine in Houston

References

External links

 Chapultepec Lupita at Lonely Planet
 Chapultepec Lupita at Zomato

Mexican-American culture in Houston
Neartown, Houston
Restaurants in Houston
Tex-Mex restaurants